Kim Dong-soo (born February 28, 1969) is a South Korean sprint canoer who competed in the late 1980s. At the 1988 Summer Olympics in Seoul, he was eliminated in the repechages of both the K-1 1000 m and the K-4 1000 m events.

External links
Sports-Reference.com profile

1969 births
Canoeists at the 1988 Summer Olympics
Living people
Olympic canoeists of South Korea
South Korean male canoeists
Asian Games medalists in canoeing
Canoeists at the 1990 Asian Games
Medalists at the 1990 Asian Games
Asian Games silver medalists for South Korea
Asian Games bronze medalists for South Korea